Thomas Farrant Higham (20 September 1890, in Kesari, Punjab – 29 January 1975, in Oxford) was an English classical scholar and translator.

Life 
Higham was born in Kesari, Punjab, then part of the British Raj, to English parents Thomas and Eliza Higham. The family shortly thereafter returned to England and Thomas was educated at Clifton before going up to Trinity College, Oxford to read classics, gaining a First in Honour Moderations and the 1912 Gaisford Prize for Greek verse composition. (He submitted a translation, into Theocritean hexameters, of the first nine lines of George Meredith's Love in the Valley). He was subsequently elected a Fellow of his college in 1914. In 1915 he married Mary Elizabeth Rogers, who bore him one son and one daughter.

During the First World War, Higham served with the British Forces in Salonika (1916–19). During the Second World War, he was attached to the Foreign Office (1940–45). From 1939 to 1958 he was Public Orator of Oxford University. He died in retirement at Oxford on 29 January 1975.

Works

As editor 

 (with Gilbert Murray, Cyril Bailey, E. A. Barber, C. M. Bowra) The Oxford Book of Greek Verse (Oxford: Clarendon Press, 1930)
 (with C. M. Bowra) The Oxford Book of Greek Verse in Translation (Oxford: Clarendon Press, 1938)

As author 

 The Hoopoe's Call of Aristophanes (London: Hampden Press, 1945)
 Orationes Oxonienses selectae; short Latin speeches on distinguished contemporaries (Oxford: Clarendon Press, 1960)

References

Citations

Bibliography 
 Fisher, Barbara, ed. (1988). Joyce Cary Remembered in letters and interviews by his family and others. Totawa, New Jersey: Barnes & Noble.
 Pelling, Christopher (2015). "The Rhetoric of The Roman Revolution", Syllecta Classica 26.
 "Thomas Farrant Higham", National Portrait Gallery. Retrieved 7 December 2021.

1890 births
1975 deaths
Fellows of Trinity College, Oxford
Classical scholars
Translators from English
Translators to English